The 2006 NCAA Division I women's basketball tournament was held from March 18 to April 4, 2006, at several sites, with the championship game held in Boston. The Maryland Terrapins, coached by Brenda Frese, won their first National Championship, beating the Duke Blue Devils, coached by Gail Goestenkors, 78–75 in overtime. Laura Harper of the Terrapins was named Most Outstanding Player.

The field is set at 64 teams, with 31 automatic bids and 33 at-large bids. Unlike the men's game, there is no play-in game. In addition, the first two rounds and regionals are usually played on "neutral" sites.

This was the first (and, as of 2022, last) Women's final four since 1999 not to have either Connecticut or Tennessee.

Notable events
In the Albuquerque Regional, Boston College upset the number one seed, Ohio State, in the second round. BC went on to play fifth seeded Utah in the regional semifinal, but Utah won by three points. Utah then played Maryland in the Regional final. With under eight seconds to go in regulation, Utah was trailing by a single point, with Shona Thorburn at the free throw line for two shots. She only made one, and the game went into overtime. This was familiar territory for the Terrapins, who were now playing in the fifth overtime game of their season. They had won the previous four, and would outscore Utah 12–2 to advance to the Final Four.

In the Bridgeport Regional, Connecticut won their first two games easily, then faced Georgia in their home state. The Huskies started out poorly, going without a single point for a stretch of over six minutes and were down 25–10 with under seven minutes to go in the first half. Then UConn scored 22 of the next 23 points to take a six-point lead. Georgia did not quit, and with seconds left, had a one-point lead. UConn had the ball and set up a last-ditch play. The play broke down, but Barbara Turner, not known as a three-point shooter, hit a three-pointer to put Connecticut up by two points with under two seconds to play. Georgia took a desperation, length of the court shot which bounced off the rim, and Connecticut held on to advance to the regional final. UConn head coach Geno Auriemma was quoted as saying, "I told the guys in the locker room, there are times that if you are lucky, fate taps you on the shoulder and you are ready. And today, we were ready".

In the regional final, top seeded Duke faced second seed UConn.  With Connecticut down by two points late in the game, the Huskies Mel Thomas hit a two pint jumper to tie the game at 55 points apiece. Duke had 20 seconds left to hit a shot to take the lead. They called a timeout to set up a play but it broke down, and they called a timeout with three seconds left. The inbound pass ended up near half court, where an attempted buzzer beater bounced off the backboard, and the game went into overtime. The Blue Devils pulled out to a five-point lead with under three minutes to go, but did not score another point. UConn had the ball for a final play, down by two points, but Charde Houston missed an open jumper, and Duke won the right to go to the Final Four in Boston.

The Cleveland Regional had the top four seeds in the regional semifinal, and the top two in the final, with top seed North Carolina beating Tennessee to advance to the Final Four. It was their first trip to the Final Four for the Tarheels since 1994, when they had won the National Championship. The San Antonio Regional largely followed the seeding, although third-seeded Stanford upset Oklahoma to reach the regional final. Although top seeded LSU was down by five points at halftime, they came back to beat Stanford by three points to earn a trip to the Final Four. LSU had only a one-point lead, when Candice Wiggins drove to the basket but Seimone Augustus stood in the way and took a charge. Wiggins had passed the ball to Krista Rappahahn who hit a three-pointer, but it was waved off because of the charge.

LSU was one of just seven schools to place both their men's and women's basketball teams in the Final Four in the same year. But one night after the men lost by double digits to UCLA, the women lost as well. Duke had a double-digit lead at halftime, which LSU cut to six points, but Duke then went on an 11–1 run to build the lead back up. Duke won the game 64–55 to head to the championship game.

North Carolina entered the other semifinal against Maryland with only a single loss on the season, but that loss was to Maryland. The first half was close, with Maryland holding just a two-point lead at the half. The Terrapins extended the lead in the second half to double digits, but North Carolina came back to cut the lead to three points with just over a minute left in the game. They would get no closer, and Maryland held on to win 81–70 to advance to the final game.

The semifinal wins set up an all-ACC championship game, between the two highest scoring teams in Division I. Duke had won 14 of the last 15 meetings between the two teams, but the sole win by Maryland in the streak was the most recent—the ACC semifinal match up. This game started as if it were a return to the usual results, with Duke reaching a double-digit lead at halftime, and extending to a 13-point lead in the second half. Maryland fought back, and with seconds to go in the game Kristi Toliver hit a three-pointer to tie the game. The game went into overtime, the sixth time this season Maryland had been in an overtime game. The Terrapins had won all five prior overtimes  games, and this would be no different. Although down in overtime, Toliver hit two free throws to put her team back in front, and Maryland held on to win their first National Championship.

Locations

The tournament once again used the pod system, meaning that teams were more likely to play closer to home earlier in the tournament. The sites for the first two rounds were as follows:

March 18 and 20:
Allstate Arena, Rosemont, Illinois (Host: DePaul University)
Pepsi Center, Denver, Colorado (Host: University of Colorado at Boulder and Big 12 Conference)
McKale Center, Tucson, Arizona (Host: University of Arizona)
Memorial Gymasium, Nashville, Tennessee (Host: Vanderbilt University)

March 19 and 21:
Ted Constant Convocation Center, Norfolk, Virginia (Host: Old Dominion University)
Sovereign Bank Arena, Trenton, New Jersey (Host: Rider University and Metro Atlantic Athletic Conference)
Bryce Jordan Center, University Park, Pennsylvania (Host: Pennsylvania State University)
Mackey Arena, West Lafayette, Indiana (Host: Purdue University)

The Regional sites for this year (named after the city, a practice that is in use for the second consecutive year) were:
March 25 and 27
Albuquerque Regional: The Pit, Albuquerque, New Mexico (Host: University of New Mexico)
San Antonio Regional: AT&T Center, San Antonio, Texas (Host: University of Texas at San Antonio)
March 26 and 28
Bridgeport Regional: Bridgeport Arena at Harbor Yard, Bridgeport, Connecticut (Host: Fairfield University)
Cleveland Regional: Quicken Loans Arena, Cleveland, Ohio (Host: Cleveland State University and the Mid-American Conference)

The winners of the regionals advanced to the Final Four, held at TD Garden, Boston, Massachusetts on April 2–4, 2006, hosted by Harvard University and Northeastern University.

Tournament records
 Free throws—Erlana Larkins, North Carolina attempted 15 free throws in the national semifinal game against Maryland, tied for the most number of free throws attempted in an NCAA semifinal game.
 Rebounds—Khara Smith, DePaul, recorded 47 rebounds in three games. The 15.7 rebounds per game is the most ever occurring in an NCAA Tournament.
 Rebounds—Duke recorded 292 rebounds, the most ever recorded by a single team in an NCAA Tournament.

Qualifying teams - automatic
Sixty-four teams were selected to participate in the 2006 NCAA Tournament. Thirty-one conferences were eligible for an automatic bid to the 2006 NCAA tournament.

Qualifying teams - at-large
Thirty-three additional teams were selected to complete the sixty-four invitations.

Tournament seeds

Bids by conference
Thirty-one conferences earned an automatic bid.  In twenty-three cases, the automatic bid was the only representative from the conference. Thirty-three additional at-large teams were selected from eight of the conferences.

Bids by state

The sixty-four teams came from twenty-nine states, plus Washington, D.C. California had the most teams with six bids. Twenty-one states did not have any teams receiving bids.

Brackets
Data source
*-Overtime game.

Cleveland Regional

Albuquerque Regional

Bridgeport Regional

San Antonio Regional

Final Four  – TD Banknorth Garden (Boston, Massachusetts)

Alb-Albuquerque; Bpt-Bridgeport; Cle-Cleveland; SA-San Antonio.

Record by  conference

Twenty-one conferences went 0-1: Atlantic Sun Conference, Big Sky Conference,  Big South Conference, Big West Conference, Colonial, Horizon League, Ivy League, MAAC, MAC, Mid-Continent, MEAC, Missouri Valley Conference, Northeast Conference, Ohio Valley Conference,  Patriot League, Southern Conference, Southland, SWAC, Sun Belt Conference, West Coast Conference, and WAC

All-Tournament Team

 Laura Harper, Maryland
 Alison Bales, Duke
 Monique Currie, Duke
 Erlana Larkins, North Carolina
 Kristi Toliver, Maryland

Game Officials

 Melissa Barlow (semifinal)
 Scott Yarbrough (semifinal)
 Eric Brewton (semifinal)
 Dee Kantner (semifinal)
 Denise Brooks-Clauser (semifinal)
 Michael Price (semifinal)
 Lisa Mattingly (final)
 Bob Trammell (final)
 Tina Napier (final)

See also
 2006 NCAA Division II women's basketball tournament
 2006 NCAA Division III women's basketball tournament
 2006 NAIA Division I women's basketball tournament
 2006 NAIA Division II women's basketball tournament
 2006 NCAA Division I men's basketball tournament

Notes 

NCAA Division I women's basketball tournament
Tournament
NCAA Division I women's basketball tournament
NCAA Division I women's basketball tournament
Basketball in San Antonio